South Carolina Highway 392 (SC 392) is a  state highway in the U.S. state of South Carolina. The highway connects rural areas of Aiken and Saluda counties with Ridge Spring.

Route description
SC 392 begins at an intersection with U.S. Route 1 (US 1; Columbia Highway) south-southeast of Ridge Spring, Aiken County. This intersection is southwest of Aiken Wayside Park. It travels to the northwest and curves to the north-northwest. The highway enters Saluda County. It crosses Flat Rock Creek and passes by Flat Rock Cemetery just before entering the city limits of Ridge Spring. At Main Street, it meets its northern terminus, an intersection with SC 23/SC 39.

Major intersections

See also

References

External links

SC 392 at Virginia Highways' South Carolina Highways Annex

392
Transportation in Aiken County, South Carolina
Transportation in Saluda County, South Carolina